The 2002 Buy.com Tour season ran from March 7 to November 2. The season consisted of 28 official money golf tournaments; three of which were played outside of the United States. The top 15 players on the year-end money list earned their PGA Tour card for 2003. It was the final year in which the tour was sponsored by Buy.com, before it was replaced by current sponsor Nationwide.

Schedule
The following table lists official events during the 2002 season.

Money leaders
For full rankings, see 2002 Buy.com Tour graduates.

The money list was based on prize money won during the season, calculated in U.S. dollars. The top 15 players on the tour earned status to play on the 2003 PGA Tour.

Awards

See also
2002 Buy.com Tour graduates

Notes

External links
All information from here

Korn Ferry Tour seasons
Buy.com Tour